William Campbell-Taylor (also known as William Taylor) is a Church of England vicar of St Thomas' Church, Clapton Common in Hackney Deanery in the Diocese of London. He became the first candidate standing for any political party to be elected to the Common Council of the City of London Corporation, breaking the tradition of Aldermen and Councilmen in the financial capital being elected as non-party political independents, which outcome City A.M. Newspaper described as "even more controversial than could be expected". He won the by-election in Portsoken for the Labour Party in March 2014 and remained a Common Councilman until the elections of March 2017, after which there were five Labour Common Councilmen.

He was defeated in the Aldermanic by-election, December 2017 for Portsoken by Prem Goyal by a margin of 228 to 143 votes.

The City Matters website states that Campbell-Taylor "was forced to defend himself against allegations of sexual abuse after becoming the target of a direct mail campaign in the Middlesex Street Estate", and he has been the subject of safeguarding complaints by Portsoken residents to Bishop of London, Sarah Mullally. The Editor of the Church of England Newspaper published an article which stated that a legal complainant of clergy sexual abuse under the Clergy Discipline Measure 2003 (CDM) had "been subjected to a campaign of harassment and bullying since he reported an indecent assault by a London clergyman" and that "he has now lodged CDM complaints against Bishop Sarah Mullally and the Rev William Campbell Taylor". In a follow-up article concerning the release by international artists of a music video about this case, the Editor of the Church of England Newspaper further states, "My article revealed that a legal complaint of clergy abuse filed with a Clergy Discipline Measure, was shockingly leaked by a Bishop to the alleged abuser".

References

Politicians from London
Labour Party (UK) councillors
Councilmen of the City of London